Meydancık Castle is a castle ruin in Mersin Province,  Turkey. The original name was Kirshu and the name of the ruin during Ottoman times was Beydili Kale.

Geography 
It is on a  hill at the west of the road between Gülnar and Aydıncık. Visitors can reach the castle either from Gülnar by an  road or from Aydıncık by a  road.

History 
After the collapse of the Hittite Empire, Anatolia experienced a period of turmoil. Many small states emerged, one of which was Pirandu in South Anatolia, which was established by the Luwian people at the west of the Göksu River around the 7th century BC. The capital of Pirandu was Kirshu. However, in the 6th century BC, Kirshu was sacked by the Babylon Emperor Neriglissar. After Babylon was defeated by the Persians, Kirshu came under Achaemenid rule and after the Achaemenid Empire was defeated by Alexander III of Macedon, Kirshu was incorporated within the realm of the Ptolemaic dynasty of Egypt 
and later that of the Seleucid Empire.

The fortification 
The plan of the fortification is roughly rectangular, with the longer dimension oriented along a north–south axis. The total area is 750 x 150 m2 (2460 x 490 ft2) In the fortification the military units were at the north side of the hill and the only entrance to the castle was via the gate at the northeast corner. The palace was in the middle. A public treasure consisting of 5215 coins from various Hellenistic states has been unearthed in the palace. These coins are now exhibited in Silifke Museum. Another important find was a stamp of Muwatalli II,  which was surprising because Hittites inhabited the area long before the establishment of Pirundu. At the southern end, there is a wide wellhole, the function of which is debatable. It might either be a cistern or an altar or may even be a secret passage.  At the present, excavations down to  give no clue.

References

Forts in Turkey
Former populated places in Turkey
Ruined castles in Turkey
Castles in Mersin Province
Archaeological sites in Mersin Province, Turkey